Cottontail Ranch was a legal, licensed brothel in Nevada that opened in October 1967.  Located near the intersection of U.S. Route 95 and State Route 266 known as Lida Junction, in Esmeralda County, Nevada.  It was also known as the Cottontail Ranch Club.

History 

In 1967, Howard Hughes allegedly made several visits to the Cottontail Ranch for entertainment while he was living in Las Vegas.

In the 1970s, then madam Beverly Harrell battled with the United States Bureau of Land Management which was attempting to have the brothel removed from federal land.  Harrell also was a candidate for the Nevada Assembly in 1974. She published a book about the Ranch, An Orderly House, in 1975.

A record, Coming My Way, was released in 1976 and was a collection of stories by the employees of the brothel. 

Howard Harrell operated the brothel before selling the Cottontail.

The Cottontail Ranch was closed in 2004 when the madam retired. All the real estate was purchased by real estate investor Lanny D. Love; Miss Love also purchased a luxury ranch called Lida Ranch a few miles from the brothel. And an additional  in a ghost town called Lida.

A Fire destroyed what was left of the Cottontail Ranch in Esmeralda County on Sept. 5, 2022.

The land remains for sale.

See also
 List of brothels in Nevada
 Prostitution in Nevada

References

External links
 Cottontail Ranch (archived at Wayback Machine, March 25, 2004)
 a brief history of the Cottontail Ranch

Brothels in Nevada
Buildings and structures in Esmeralda County, Nevada
1967 establishments in Nevada